Dennis N. Assanis is a Greek academic administrator, scientist, engineer and author. He is the 28th president of the University of Delaware, a position he has held since June 6, 2016.

Biography 
Assanis was born and raised in Athens, Greece, Assanis earned his bachelor's degree in Marine Engineering from Newcastle University in England (1980). At the Massachusetts Institute of Technology, he earned three master's degrees: Naval Architecture and Marine Engineering (1982), Mechanical Engineering (1982) and Management (1986). Also at MIT, he earned a Ph.D. in Power and Propulsion (1985).

Career 
Assanis served as Provost and Senior Vice President of Academic Affairs of Stony Brook University, a position he held from 2011 to 2016. He also served as vice president for Brookhaven National Laboratory Affairs.

Assanis was the Jon R. and Beverly S. Holt Professor of Engineering and Arthur F. Thurnau Professor at the University of Michigan, the Director of the University of Michigan Michigan Memorial Phoenix Energy Institute, the Founding Director of the U.S.-China Clean Energy Research Center for Clean Vehicles, and the Director of the University of Michigan Automotive Laboratory.

From 1996 to 2002, he was the Founding Director of the Automotive Engineering Program at the University of Michigan, and the Department Chair of Mechanical Engineering from 2002 to 2007. He then served as Director of the Automative Research Center from 2002 to 2009, and the Founding Director of the General Motors-University of Michigan Collaborative Research Laboratory for Advanced Engine Systems from 2002 to 2011.

In 2008, Assanis was elected to the National Academy of Engineering, which cited his "scientific contributions to improving fuel economy and reducing emissions of internal combustion engines, and for promoting automotive engineering education."

In May 2022, President Joe Biden appointed Assanis to the President's Council of Advisors on Science and Technology.

References
https://www.washingtonpost.com/national/ud-president-questioned-about-lack-of-delaware-students/2020/02/08/75ecf954-4a9b-11ea-8a1f-de1597be6cbc_story.html

Year of birth missing (living people)
Living people
Stony Brook University faculty
Presidents of the University of Delaware
21st-century American engineers
American science writers
American people of Greek descent
University of Michigan faculty
Alumni of Newcastle University